The 1977 Sun Bowl may refer to:

 1977 Sun Bowl (January) - January 2, 1977, game between the Texas A&M Aggies and the Florida Gators
 1977 Sun Bowl (December) - December 31, 1977, game between the Stanford Cardinals and the LSU Tigers